Maison Kitsuné is a French-Japanese lifestyle brand founded in 2002 by Gildas Loaëc, Masaya Kuroki, and the London-based company Åbäke. Kitsuné operates as a fashion brand, a record label, an art gallery, and a chain of cafés and restaurants worldwide. Kitsune (きつね, 狐) is the Japanese word for "fox," which is featured prominently in their ready-to-wear collections. Kitsuné Musique and Café Kitsuné are the sub-brands of their record label and chain of coffee shops, respectively.

History

Founding
Maison Kitsuné was founded in 2002 as a record label by Gildas Loaëc and Masaya Kuroki in Paris. The founders first met in Loaëc's record shop in Paris where house music lovers, including Kuroki, Daft Punk, and others, frequented. After a trip to Japan for a music video together, they came up with the idea of launching a lifestyle brand not confined to one discipline. The result was Maison Kitsuné, which blends music and fashion as a multi-faceted Paris-meets-Tokyo brand. The pair promoted the brand by performing DJ sets, which was followed by the release of the first t-shirt, shirt, dress, and eventually a full fledged ready-to-wear collection in 2005 that represents 90 percent of its revenue today. Before co-founding the company, Loaëc worked with Daft Punk and also with Thomas Bangalter's record label Roulé.

In 2013, Maison Kitsuné expanded their brand by opening a coffee shop called Café Kitsuné in Tokyo, Japan. The first café-restaurant opened in Paris, France in 2019. They have since expanded Café Kitsuné to 21 locations worldwide, including in Tokyo, Paris, New York City, London, Vancouver, and Shanghai.

The name Kitsuné comes from the Japanese word kitsune (Hiragana: きつね, kanji: 狐) meaning "fox". In Japan, the fox is said to have the power to change its appearance and its face; the many faces and appearances of the fox represent the different parts and directions of Kitsuné.

Kitsuné Musique

Artists
Note: This list does not include artists whose songs appeared solely on compilations released by Kitsuné.

 Acid Girls
 Adam Sky
 Alan Braxe
 Alex Gopher
 Appaloosa
 Archigram
 DJ Assault
 autoKratz
 BeatauCue
 Beni
 Benjamin Theves
 Ben Kaba (Urban Astronaut) 
 Big Face
 Bitchee Bitchee Ya Ya Ya
 Black Strobe
 Bloc Party
 Boys Noize
 Buscabulla
 Captain Comatose
 Cazals
 Chew Lips
 Childish Gambino
 Christopher Just & Raphael Just
 Chrome Sparks
 Citizens!
 Classixx
 Crystal Fighters
 Cut Copy
 David E. Sugar
 Delphic
 Dieter Schmidt
 Digitalism
 Fantastic Plastic Machine
 Fischerspooner
 Florrie
 Fox N' Wolf
 Fred Falke
 Gigamesh
 DJ Gregory
 Guns 'n' Bombs
 Hadouken!
 HeartsRevolution
 Hey Today!
 Hot Chip
 Housse de Racket
 I Scream Ice Cream
 Is Tropical
 Jence
 Jennifer Delano
 Joakim
 Joe and Will Ask?
 Jupiter
 Juveniles
 Kaos
 Kilo Kish
 Khan
 Klaxons
 La Roux
 Lacquer
 Le Corps Mince de Françoise
 Les Gillettes
 Lost Valentinos
 Man with Guitar
 Marco dos Santos
 MAY68
 The Mogs
 MOTHXR
 Mija
 Mr Fabbbian Nappp
 Lacquer
 Palermo Disko Machine
 Parcels
 Passions
 Pat Lok
 Phoenix
 Phones
 Pin Me Down
 Play Paul
 Playgroup
 Polarsets
 Popular Computer
 Punks Jump Up
 Rex the Dog
 Romuald
 Ruben Dawnson
 S'Express
 Schwarz Dont Crack
 Shakedown
 Shindu
 Simian Mobile Disco
 Slagsmålsklubben
 Streetlife DJs
 Ted & Francis
 The Teenagers
 Thieves Like Us
 The Things
 Tom Vek
 Tomboy
 Towa Tei
 Two Door Cinema Club
 urfabrique
 VHS or Beta
 Volga Select
 The Whip
 The Whitest Boy Alive
 The World Domination
 Years & Years
 Yelle
 You Love Her Coz She's Dead
 Zongamin

Discography

Studio albums

 Coming on Strong – Hot Chip (2004)
 Idealism – Digitalism (2007)
 What of Our Future – Cazals (2008)
 Down & Out in Paris & London – autoKratz (2008)
 Animal – autoKratz (2009)
 Tourist History – Two Door Cinema Club (2010)
 Star of Love – Crystal Fighters (2010)
 Native To – Is Tropical (2011)
 Alesia – Housse de Racket (2011)
 Here We Are – Citizens! (2012)
 Beacon – Two Door Cinema Club (2012)

Compilations and remix albums

 Kitsuné Love (2002)
 Kitsuné Midnight (2004)
 Kitsuné X (2005)
 Kitsuné Maison Compilation (2005)
 Kitsuné Maison Compilation 2 (2006)
 Kitsuné Maison Compilation 3 (2006)
 Kitsuné Maison Compilation 4 (2007)
 Kitsuné BoomBox Mixed by Jerry Bouthier (2007)
 Kitsuné Maison Compilation 5 (2008)
 Gildas & Masaya – Paris (2008)
 Kitsuné Tabloid Compiled & Mixed by Digitalism (2008)
 Kitsuné Maison Compilation 6 (2008)
 Gildas & Masaya – New York (2009)
 Kitsuné Remixes Album #1 (2009)
 Kitsuné Tabloid by Phoenix (2009)
 Kitsuné Maison Compilation 7: The Lucky One (2009)
 Kitsuné Remixes Album #2 (2009)
 Kitsuné Maison Compilation 8 (2009)
 Gildas & Masaya – Tokyo (2010)
 Kitsuné Maison Compilation 9: Petit Bateau Edition (2010)
 Kitsuné x Ponystep Mixed by Jerry Bouthier (2010)
 Kitsuné Remixes Album #3 (2010)
 Kitsuné Maison Compilation 10: The Fireworks Issue (2010)
 "André & Gildas – Kitsuné Parisien (2011)
* Kitsuné Maison Compilation 11: The Indie-Dance Issue (2011)
 Gildas Kitsuné Club Night Mix (2011)
 Kitsuné Tabloid by The Twelves (2011)
 Kitsuné Maison Compilation 12: The Good Fun Issue (2011)
 Gildas Kitsuné Club Night Mix #2 (2011)
 André & Gildas – Kitsuné Parisien II (2012)
 Kitsuné America (2012)
 Kitsuné Maison Compilation 14: The 10th Anniversary Issue (2012)
 Gildas Kitsuné Club Night Mix #3 (2012)
 "André & Gildas – Kitsuné Parisien III (2013)
* "Kitsuné America 2" (2013)
 Kitsuné Maison Compilation 15 (2013)
 Kitsuné New Faces (2014)
 Kitsuné America 3 (2014)
 Kitsuné Maison Compilation 16: The Sweet Sixteen Issue (2014)
 Kitsuné New Faces II (2015)
 Kitsuné Maison Compilation 17: World Wild Issue (2015)
 Kitsuné Maison 18: The Hysterical Advisory Issue (2016)
 Kitsuné Parisien 4: The New French Touch (2017)
 Kitsuné Afterwork: Volume 1 (2017)
 Kitsuné America 5: The NBA Edition (2018)
 Café Kitsuné: Mix by Pat Lok (2018)
 Kitsuné Parisien: The Art-de-vivre Issue (2019)
 Café Kitsuné: Mix by Young Franco (2019)
 Café Kitsuné: Mixed by Young Franco (2019)
 Kitsuné America: House Kitsuné America (2020)
 Café Kitsuné Mixed by Fabich (2020)

References

External links
 
 
 Kitsuné discography

 
Clothing companies of France
Clothing brands of France
Electronic music record labels
French record labels
Record labels established in 2002
French companies established in 2002
Clothing companies established in 2002
2002 establishments in France
Design companies established in 2002
French brands
Clothing brands
Companies based in Paris